Seong-Jin Cho (born May 28, 1994) is a South Korean pianist. He rose to fame within South Korea and the international classical music world in 2015 after winning the XVII International Chopin Piano Competition, becoming the first South Korean pianist to do so.

Early life and education
Cho was born in Seoul, South Korea. He began playing the piano at a young age and gave his first public recital when he was twelve years old. He graduated from Yewon School. He was taught by Prof. Park Sook-ryeon and Professor Shin Soo-jung and studied at the Conservatoire de Paris as a student of Michel Béroff.

Career 
Cho has won numerous awards including First Prize at both the International Fryderyk Chopin Competition for Young Pianists (2008) and the Hamamatsu International Piano Competition (2009). He has also received Third Prize at the International Tchaikovsky Competition in Moscow (2011) and the Arthur Rubinstein International Piano Master Competition in Tel Aviv (2014). In 2015, Cho won First Prize in the XVII International Chopin Piano Competition.

As a soloist, Cho has performed with many major orchestras including the Berliner Philharmoniker, Los Angeles Philharmonic, Mariinsky Orchestra, NHK Symphony Orchestra, Orchestre de Paris, Philharmonia Orchestra, Royal Concertgebouw Orchestra and the Royal Liverpool Philharmonic Orchestra. He also regularly collaborates with eminent conductors such as Vladimir Ashkenazy, Myung-Whun Chung, Gustavo Dudamel, Valery Gergiev, Vasily Petrenko, Mikhail Pletnev, Esa-Pekka Salonen and Yuri Temirkanov. In recent years, he has toured countries such as Japan, Germany, France, Russia, Poland, Israel, China and the USA.

An active recitalist, Cho performs in many leading concert halls, including New York’s Carnegie Hall, Amsterdam’s Concertgebouw, Los Angeles’s Walt Disney Concert Hall, Munich’s Prinzregententheater, Wiener Konzerthaus, Tokyo’s Suntory Hall and the Berliner Philharmonie. He has been also been a guest artist at numerous festivals such as the Verbier Festival, Menuhin Festival Gstaad and the Rheingau Musik Festival.

In 2017, Cho gave his debut with the Berliner Philharmoniker under Sir Simon Rattle replacing Lang Lang during parts of the orchestra’s Asia tour.

Discography

Awards

 2008: International Fryderyk Chopin Competition for Young Pianists - First Prize
 2009: Hamamatsu International Piano Competition - First Prize
 2011: International Tchaikovsky Competition (piano) - Third Prize
 2014: Arthur Rubinstein International Piano Master Competition - Third Prize
 2015: XVII International Chopin Piano Competition - First Prize

References

External links

1994 births
Artists from Seoul
Deutsche Grammophon artists
International Chopin Piano Competition winners
Living people
Prize-winners of the International Chopin Piano Competition
Prize-winners of the International Tchaikovsky Competition
South Korean classical pianists
Conservatoire de Paris alumni